Eliezer Halfin (18 June 1948 – 6 September 1972) was a Latvian-born wrestler with the Israeli Olympic team at the 1972 Summer Olympics in Munich, Germany. Along with 10 other athletes and coaches he was taken hostage and later murdered by Palestinian Black September terrorists on 5 September 1972.

Eventually they were brought to a German airport and during an attempted rescue mission staged by the German police, all nine hostages were killed on 6 September. Five of the terrorists and one German policeman were also killed. The subsequent autopsy, carried out by the Forensic Institute of the University of Munich, concluded that Halfin had died from a bullet to the heart and noted that Vivil mints were found in both trouser pockets of his corpse.

Eliezer was a mechanic by profession and was born in Riga, Latvia. He came to Israel in 1969 and officially became an Israeli citizen seven months prior to his death. He was survived by his parents and a sister. He was a lightweight wrestler and was active for 11 years. In Israel he was a member of Hapoel Tel Aviv club. He won 12th place in the world championships. During 1971 he placed second place in the international competition in Bucharest, Romania. In 1972 in Greece he placed 3rd. Participating in the 20th Olympic Games was the highlight of his career and his dream. Eliezer is buried in Kiryat Shaul cemetery in Tel Aviv.

See also
 Munich Olympics massacre

References

External links

1948 births
1972 deaths
20th-century Israeli Jews
Jewish wrestlers
Wrestlers at the 1972 Summer Olympics
Israeli male sport wrestlers
Latvian Jews
Olympic wrestlers of Israel
Victims of the Munich massacre
Deaths by firearm in Germany
Sportspeople from Riga
Soviet male sport wrestlers
Soviet emigrants to Israel
Burials at Kiryat Shaul Cemetery